The Annunziata Polyptych is a  painting cycle started by Filippino Lippi and finished by Pietro Perugino, whose central panel is now divided between the Galleria dell'Accademia (Deposition from the Cross) and the Basilica dell'Annunziata, both in Florence, Italy. The polyptych had other six panels, which are housed in the Lindenau-Museum of Altenburg, the Metropolitan Museum of  New York City, the  Galleria Nazionale d'Arte Antica in Rome and in a private collection in South Africa.

History
The work was originally commissioned to Filippino Lippi for the high altar of the Annunziata Basilica in Florence. Lippi had already ceded the same commission to Leonardo da Vinci, who had executed a cartoon with St. Anne, the Virgin and the Child, before abandoning the work when he followed Cesare Borgia (1502). The work was thus reassigned to Lippi, who changed completely the theme. At his death in 1504 the painting, already completed in the central part, was assigned to Pietro Perugino, who completed it, including the secondary panels, in 1507.

Once finished, the painting was sharply criticized by the Florentines, due to the alleged lack of originality of the composition. At the time, Perugino was often re-using the same cartoons, due to big number of commissions. The Annunciation altarpiece was thus Perugino's last work in Florence.

Description
The work was originally painted on two sides: the Assumption of the Virgin facing  the faithful, and the Deposition from the Cross facing the choir. After the panel was split in two, the latter was moved in the Grand Duke's collections, and then to the Gallerie dell'Accademia; the Assumption remained in the church, and was later moved to the Rabatta Chapel. The polyptych had a frame designed by Baccio d'Agnolo.

The Deposition shows the moment in which Jesus Christ is taken down from the cross after his death. Four men are carrying out the task by using ladders. On the ground, at the left, is the Virgin, fainting in the Swoon of the Virgin, and supported by the other Pious Women. The person praying at the foot of the cross is Mary Magdalene, regarding reverently the feet that she had so recently washed and anointed.  On the right, caught in a surprised posture, is St. John the Apostle; in front of him, on the ground, are the nails of the crucifixion. It could also be that he is advising the men to be careful with their task, to handle the body of the Lord with ultimate care.

According to Giorgio Vasari, Lippi executed the upper part of the painting. Jesus, left unfinished, was completed by Perugino concerning the face. The latter also painted the lower part of the work, characterized by his typical serene faces and the distant landscape. Perugino's assistants painted a great number of details, especially in the side panels.

The polyptych was completed by a predella, now divided between several American museums. It included:

Nativity, 26.7x42.6 cm, Art Institute of Chicago 
Baptism of Christ, 26.7x42.6 cm, Art Institute of Chicago 
The Samaritan Girl at the Pit, 26,7x42.6 cm, Art Institute of Chicago 
Noli me tangere, 26.7x42.6 cm, Art Institute of Chicago 
Resurrection of Christ, 27x45.7 cm, New York, Metropolitan Museum 
Predella of the Annunziata Polyptych

Sources

External links
Page at Florence's Museums website 

1507 paintings
Paintings by Filippino Lippi
Paintings by Pietro Perugino
Paintings in the collection of the Galleria dell'Accademia
Paintings depicting Jesus
Paintings of the Virgin Mary
Paintings in the collection of the Metropolitan Museum of Art
Musical instruments in art
Altarpieces
Paintings depicting Mary Magdalene